The 1969 NC State Wolfpack football team represented North Carolina State University during the 1969 NCAA University Division football season. The Wolfpack were led by 16th-year head coach Earle Edwards and played their home games at Carter Stadium in Raleigh, North Carolina. They competed as members of the Atlantic Coast Conference, finishing in second.

Schedule

References

NC State
NC State Wolfpack football seasons
NC State Wolfpack football